Khao Chakan is a district (amphoe) in the western part of Sa Kaeo province, eastern Thailand.

Geography
Neighboring districts are (from the north clockwise) Mueang Sa Kaeo, Watthana Nakhon, Khlong Hat, and Wang Nam Yen of Sa Kaeo Province, and Tha Takiap of Chachoengsao province.

The district is named after the hills of Khao Chakan, a group of limestone hills rising out of the valley alluvium. In the hills are several caves, including the cave temple Wat Tham Khao Chakan.

History
The minor district (king amphoe) Khao Chakan was established 30 April 1994 with four tambons split off from Mueang Sa Kaeo district. On 11 October 1997 it was upgraded to a full district.

Administration
The district is divided into four sub-districts (tambons), which are further subdivided into 62 villages (mubans). There are no municipal (thesaban) areas. Each of the sub-districts is administered by a tambon administrative organization (TAO).

References

External links
amphoe.com (Thai)

Khao Chakan